Li Jiulong (March 1929 – 19 November 2003) was a general (shangjiang) of the People's Liberation Army (PLA). He was a member of the 12th, 13th and 14th Central Committee of the Chinese Communist Party. He was a delegate to the 9th National People's Congress.

Biography
Li was born in Fengrun County, Hebei, in March 1929. He enlisted in the Eighth Route Army in August 1945, and joined the Chinese Communist Party (CCP) in December of that same year. 

During the Chinese Civil War, he served in the Northeast Field Army under Huang Yongsheng and Ding Sheng. He fought under Ding Sheng in the Korean War. For his gallant service at Sino-Vietnamese War he was promoted to commander in 1980. In June 1985, he was promoted to become commander of Jinan Military Region, a position he held until April 1990,  when he was appointed deputy head of the People's Liberation Army General Logistics Department. He became commander of Chengdu Military Region in September 1991, and served until October 1994.

On 19 November 2003, he died of an illness in Beijing, at the age of 74.

He was promoted to the rank of lieutenant general (zhongjiang) in September 1988 and general (shangjiang) in May 1994.

References

1929 births
2003 deaths
People from Tangshan
PLA National Defence University alumni
People's Liberation Army generals from Hebei
People's Republic of China politicians from Hebei
Chinese Communist Party politicians from Hebei
Commanders of the Chengdu Military Region
Commanders of the Jinan Military Region
Delegates to the 9th National People's Congress
Members of the 12th Central Committee of the Chinese Communist Party
Members of the 13th Central Committee of the Chinese Communist Party
Members of the 14th Central Committee of the Chinese Communist Party